Dorothy Megan Lowe (17 November 1915 – 16 May 2017) was an English cricketer who played primarily as a right-arm medium bowler. She appeared in four Test matches for England in 1949. She played domestic cricket for Middlesex, as well as various composite XIs.

Lowe made her Test debut against Australia at Adelaide in January 1949. She played her last Test on the same tour, against New Zealand, at Auckland in March of the same year.  She scored a total of 77 runs, with a highest score of 25 and took 4 wickets, with a best of 3/34.

She turned 100 in November 2015. In May 2017, Lowe died at home in Canterbury, aged 101.

See also
 List of centenarians (sportspeople)

References

External links
 
 

1915 births
2017 deaths
People from Syston
Sportspeople from Leicestershire
Cricketers from Leicestershire
England women Test cricketers
Middlesex women cricketers
English centenarians
Women centenarians